, occasionally shortened to Strawberry Eggs, is a Japanese anime television series conceptualized by YOM. Produced by Pioneer LDC, Toshiba Digital Frontiers Inc., Pioneer Entertainment (USA) LP., TNK and Tokyo Broadcasting System Television, the series is directed by Yūji Yamaguchi, with Yasuko Kobayashi handling series composition, Maki Fujii designing the characters and Masara Nishida composing the music. The anime aired in Japan from July 4 to September 26, 2001 on Wowow and was licensed by Geneon Entertainment in August 2002.

Plot
Hibiki Amawa is an enthusiastic young man whose dream career is to be a professional teacher, having graduated from college with a certificate in athletics. When he is unable to pay his landlady, Lulu Sanjo, the monthly rent for his apartment, he rushes off to the nearby Seitō Sannomiya Private School to apply for a position that is open, but is summarily denied employment because of his gender. Offended, and more determined than ever to have his way, Hibiki vows to demonstrate the merits of his educational philosophy to his detractors, and with offered help from Lulu, agrees to disguise himself by cross-dressing  in order to deceive the school's female-only administration. With assistance from some gadgets Lulu engineered for this purpose, he disguises himself very convincingly. Following an initial demonstration of his merits as an educator, he is hired.

Unfortunately for Hibiki, however, life as a gym teacher at this school does not go completely smoothly. With interpersonal conflicts among students causing fights and occasional mild missteps endangering his disguise, Hibiki must not only mediate his class, but also keep up appearances and navigate life in disguise.

Characters

Primary characters
Some of the characters' surnames and the school's name are derived from train station names in the Kinki area. In addition, most of the surnames of the characters of the Seitō Sannomiya Private School, except for Fūko Kuzuha, are adopted from the names of stations on the Hanshin Main Line.

 (male-Japanese), Yuki Masuda (female-Japanese), Crispin Freeman (male-English), Sally Dana (female-English)
The central protagonist of the series, Hibiki Amawa is a fairly typical college graduate whose goal is to become a professional school teacher. His life takes an unexpected turn in the process when, in order to pay off his apartment rent, he is forced to cross-dress in order to gain employment at the female-favouring Seitō Sannomiya Private School. His situation only gets more complicated when the school board grows suspicious of him, students take to fighting with each other, and one of the girls of his class (Fūko) develops romantic feelings for him.

Lulu Sanjō, more often referred to as "Granny" by her tenants, is the midget-size tough-as-nails, pistol-packing landlady of the Gochisō apartments, which also doubles as a school supply store that she also owns. Impressed by Hibiki's strong determination, she offers to help him in his mission, helping him disguise himself as a woman and maintain the disguise throughout his time on campus. She rides a Harley-Davidson FXSTS softail springer motorcycle with a twin cam engine. It is heavily implied that Lulu is a crossdresser as well.

Clumsy but selfless, Fūko Kuzuha is a student at Seitō Sannomiya. Despite being accident prone, mild-mannered, and easily flustered, Fūko is a very strong-willed girl. Much to her personal anxiety, she starts admiring Hibiki's personality, and this admiration develops into a powerful romantic attraction, bringing her considerable confusion and feelings of shame. Her mother died when she was six years old and her widower father is a traveling businessman. Fūko resides at the school dormitories. She also speaks up for Hibiki in the final episode, changing everyone's negative opinion of him when Hibiki's true gender is exposed.

Secondary characters

A salaryman who is a tenant at the Gochisō apartments; room 101. He is a pervert with a fascination with photographing female uniforms with his camera and unusually large mirror; frequently strapped on his back. He is good friends with Tofu Tofukuji.

A retired, elderly man lodging at the Gochisō apartments.

Hibiki's pet dog. Lulu often uses Kura Ge as motivational collateral for the unpaid rent. While the breed of Kura Ge is never mentioned, he seems to resemble a Bichon.

The eponymous principal of Seitō Sannomiya. She was appointed office a decade prior to the story and carries herself in a conceited, yet formal, aristocratic manner. At the conclusion of the series, it is revealed that her sexism behavior was stemmed from a man who abandoned her in her younger years, who was the former gym teacher at the school; this reveals that she is an alumna of Seito Sannomiya.

Vice-principal of Seitō Sannomiya. She works closely with Chieko Sannomiya, and like her, is a stern man-hater, resulting from a failed marriage. Reiko grows suspicious of Hibiki early into his career and tries debunking his identity several times. Reiko was successful in exposing Hibiki's true gender in the end, but her plan in turning Seitō into an all-girls school was tarnished by Fūko's defensive speech for Hibiki.

An aggressive tomboy, Fujio Himejima is a student at Seitō Sannomiya. She wears her hair in two loose pigtails, tied by her signature green bows. She has a black belt in Aikido and develops a crush on fellow student Akira Fukae, who unfortunately does not reciprocate. Fujio resides in the dormitories.

Miho Umeda is a student at the school and is Fujio's closest friend. Her maturity is considerably more developed than her friends and this at times makes her behave in an arrogant manner; especially when it comes to her past and current experiences with boys. As a result, the other girls tend to look up to her and this prompts her to act like a role model for them. Miho resides in the dormitories. She is a foil to Seiko Kasuganomichi.

Seiko Kasuganomichi is a fairly quiet student. Her family is wealthy and she is often seen sheltered. She gets uncomfortable at the sight of naked men, in photographs or in the flesh.

Quiet and composed, Akira Fukae is one of the primary male students on campus. Even though he usually tends to be level-headed, Akira is not afraid to speak his mind or take a stand for what he believes he is fair and just. His father is a private investigator.

Kyosuke Aoki is another one of the few male students at the school, arguably the most energetic and is also the tallest; comparable to Miho Umeda to the girls. He takes the biggest interest in Hibiki's drag and frequently proclaims it to her and the others. Kyosuke is good friends with Akira Fukae and Shoichi.

Another enrolled male student at the school and a close friend of Kyōsuke Aoki.

The board chairman of Seitō Sannomiya.

Another of the few male students. He is a gentle and quiet boy who appears in Episode 8. He stole Reiko Mukogawa's salary when he is asked by Hibiki to visit the teacher's lounge and retrieve his grade book. Shiro has a girlfriend named Makoto Uozaki.

Episode list
The anime series is animated by TNK and directed by Yūji Yamaguchi. It first aired in Japan on Wowow between July 4 and September 26, 2001, running for 13 episodes. As of December 2007, the series is out of print.

Two pieces of theme music were used for the anime; one opening theme and one ending theme. The opening theme is "Dearest," a modified version of Shoko Sawada's "Shin'ai naru Hitoe," performed by Hitomi Mieno and arranged by Masara Nishida. The ending theme is "White Station" by Ace File composed of Mae Yoshikawa, Marina Kushi, Asagi Kudo, Saori Nara, with lyrics by Rei Yoshii, and arrangement by Masala Nishida. Other music was provided by Masala Nishida.

Episodes

Adaptations

Manga
A manga adaptation illustrated by the anime's character designer Maki Fujii was serialized in MediaWorks' Dengeki Daioh magazine between December 21, 2001 and February 25, 2002. A total of 13 chapters have been published.

References

External links
Anime official website 

2001 anime television series debuts
2001 manga
Anime with original screenplays
Cross-dressing in anime and manga
Cross-dressing in television
Dengeki Daioh
Geneon USA
Shōnen manga
Teaching anime and manga
Television shows written by Yasuko Kobayashi
TNK (company)
Wowow original programming